Sattawat Pongnairat (born May 8, 1990) is an American badminton player who competed at 2016 Summer Olympics in Rio de Janeiro, Brazil. He trained at the Orange County Badminton club, and in 2015, he won a gold medal in men's doubles  with teammate Phillip Chew at the Pan American Games.

Achievements

Pan American Games 
Men's doubles

Pan Am Championships 
Men's singles

Men's doubles

Mixed doubles

BWF International Challenge/Series 
Men's singles

Men's doubles

Mixed doubles

  BWF International Challenge tournament
  BWF International Series tournament
  BWF Future Series tournament

References

External links 

 
 
 Profile at Toronto2015.org

1990 births
Living people
Sportspeople from New York City
American sportspeople of Thai descent
American male badminton players
Badminton players at the 2016 Summer Olympics
Olympic badminton players of the United States
Badminton players at the 2011 Pan American Games
Badminton players at the 2015 Pan American Games
Pan American Games gold medalists for the United States
Pan American Games silver medalists for the United States
Pan American Games medalists in badminton
Medalists at the 2011 Pan American Games
Medalists at the 2015 Pan American Games